The 2014 Croatian Cup Final was a two-legged affair played between Dinamo Zagreb and Rijeka. 
The first leg was played on 7 May 2014 in Zagreb, and the second leg was played on 13 May 2014 in Rijeka.

Rijeka won the trophy with an aggregate result of 3–0. This was the last two-legged final.

Road to the final

First leg

Second leg

External links
Official website 

2014 Final
GNK Dinamo Zagreb matches
HNK Rijeka matches
Cup Final